The Commission on Concealed Mass Graves in Slovenia is an office of the Slovenian government whose task is to find and document mass grave sites from the Second World War and the period immediately after it. It was established on November 10, 2005. The commission handed its report to the Slovenian government in October 2009.

The newspaper Jutarnji reported the commission's findings; in all, it is estimated that there are 100,000 victims in 581 mass graves. The commission's findings were used for the Reports and Proceedings of the 8th of April European public hearing on Crimes Committed by Totalitarian Regimes organised by the Slovenian Presidency of the Council of the European Union (January–June 2008) and the European Commission.

According to the “Crimes Committed by Totalitarian Regimes,"  the killings were carried out by the Yugoslav Partisan Army in 1945 and 1946.

Work
The commission has been consistently registering and gradually probing new grave sites. 
2002: 40 sites
January 2007: 512 sites
August 2007: 550 sites
February 2008: 570 sites
October 2009: 581 sites
January 2011: 594 sites

While the commission's own purpose is not to identify individual remains, research in Škofja Loka has revealed that DNA matches can still be made to identify victims.

Exhumations
Barbara Pit, discovered in 2008. Remains of over 700 people were exhumed before work was stopped.
Lancovo, discovered in 2007.
Lokavec, discovered in 2004. Twelve bodies were exhumed in 2008.
Mostec, discovered in 2010.
Prevalje, discovered in 2010. Contains the remains of approximately 700 victims.

Members
 Jože Dežman (Chairman of the commission, Director of the National Museum of Contemporary History)
 Miha Movrin
 Metka Černelč
 Majda Pučnik Rudl
 Ludvik Puklavec
 Davorin Mozetič
 Marko Štrovs
 Janez Črnej
 Blaž Kujundžič (Statistical Office of the Republic of Slovenia)
 Andrej Vovko
 Nataša Kokol Car
 Pavel Jamnik
 Davorin Vuga
 Milan Sagadin
 Jožef Bernik

Former members
 Mitja Ferenc
 Anton Drobnič

See also
Bleiburg repatriations
Commission on Concealed Mass Graves in Serbia
Foibe massacres
Kočevski Rog massacre
Tezno trench

References

External links 
Official site 

Government of Slovenia